Michael Sexton (born 5 March 1971) is a former Australian rules footballer who played for Carlton between 1990 and 2000 in the Australian Football League.

A defender, Sexton was a member of Carlton's 1995 premiership team and an All Australian in both 1996 and 1997. He was recruited from the Sandhurst Dragons.

Sexton is the brother of Ben and the cousin of Damian, who both also played in the AFL.

Sexton is member of the AFL "Laws of the Game" or Rules Committee.

Statistics

|-
|- style="background-color: #EAEAEA"
! scope="row" style="text-align:center" | 1990
|style="text-align:center;"|
| 14 || 3 || 1 || 1 || 13 || 10 || 23 || 7 || 4 || 0.3 || 0.3 || 4.3 || 3.3 || 7.7 || 2.3 || 1.3 || 0
|-
! scope="row" style="text-align:center" | 1991
|style="text-align:center;"|
| 14 || 13 || 0 || 2 || 100 || 34 || 134 || 33 || 15 || 0.0 || 0.2 || 7.7 || 2.6 || 10.3 || 2.5 || 1.2 || 0
|- style="background-color: #EAEAEA"
! scope="row" style="text-align:center" | 1992
|style="text-align:center;"|
| 14 || 19 || 1 || 1 || 162 || 69 || 231 || 70 || 23 || 0.1 || 0.1 || 8.5 || 3.6 || 12.2 || 3.7 || 1.2 || 0
|-
! scope="row" style="text-align:center" | 1993
|style="text-align:center;"|
| 14 || 23 || 3 || 5 || 252 || 111 || 363 || 129 || 27 || 0.1 || 0.2 || 11.0 || 4.8 || 15.8 || 5.6 || 1.2 || 4
|- style="background-color: #EAEAEA"
! scope="row" style="text-align:center" | 1994
|style="text-align:center;"|
| 14 || 24 || 1 || 4 || 226 || 117 || 343 || 93 || 25 || 0.0 || 0.2 || 9.4 || 4.9 || 14.3 || 3.9 || 1.0 || 0
|-
|style="text-align:center;background:#afe6ba;"|1995†
|style="text-align:center;"|
| 14 || 25 || 3 || 3 || 271 || 99 || 370 || 116 || 23 || 0.1 || 0.1 || 10.8 || 4.0 || 14.8 || 4.6 || 0.9 || 2
|- style="background-color: #EAEAEA"
! scope="row" style="text-align:center" | 1996
|style="text-align:center;"|
| 14 || 23 || 2 || 2 || 268 || 115 || 383 || 102 || 24 || 0.1 || 0.1 || 11.6 || 5.0 || 16.6 || 4.4 || 1.0 || 6
|-
! scope="row" style="text-align:center" | 1997
|style="text-align:center;"|
| 14 || 18 || 4 || 0 || 236 || 82 || 318 || 93 || 13 || 0.2 || 0.0 || 13.1 || 4.6 || 17.7 || 5.2 || 0.7 || 2
|- style="background-color: #EAEAEA"
! scope="row" style="text-align:center" | 1998
|style="text-align:center;"|
| 14 || 22 || 3 || 6 || 267 || 104 || 371 || 100 || 20 || 0.1 || 0.3 || 12.1 || 4.7 || 16.9 || 4.5 || 0.9 || 0
|-
! scope="row" style="text-align:center" | 1999
|style="text-align:center;"|
| 14 || 24 || 5 || 5 || 248 || 118 || 366 || 94 || 22 || 0.2 || 0.2 || 10.3 || 4.9 || 15.3 || 3.9 || 0.9 || 2
|- style="background-color: #EAEAEA"
! scope="row" style="text-align:center" | 2000
|style="text-align:center;"|
| 14 || 6 || 0 || 1 || 44 || 23 || 67 || 17 || 5 || 0.0 || 0.2 || 7.3 || 3.8 || 11.2 || 2.8 || 0.8 || 0
|- class="sortbottom"
! colspan=3| Career
! 200
! 23
! 30
! 2087
! 882
! 2969
! 854
! 201
! 0.1
! 0.2
! 10.4
! 4.4
! 14.8
! 4.3
! 1.0
! 16
|}

References

External links

Michael Sexton Profile in Blueseum

1971 births
Living people
VFL/AFL players born outside Australia
Australian rules footballers from Victoria (Australia)
Carlton Football Club players
Carlton Football Club Premiership players
Victorian State of Origin players
All-Australians (AFL)
Sandhurst Football Club players
One-time VFL/AFL Premiership players